In mathematics, Hadamard regularization (also called Hadamard finite part or Hadamard's partie finie) is a method of regularizing divergent integrals by dropping some divergent terms and keeping the finite part, introduced by .  showed that this can be interpreted as taking the meromorphic continuation of a convergent integral.

If the Cauchy principal value integral 

The Hadamard finite part integral above (for ) may also be given by the following equivalent definitions:

   

For details, see . (Note that the term  in the second equivalent definition above is missing in  but this is corrected in the errata sheet of the book.)

Integral equations containing Hadamard finite part integrals (with  unknown) are termed hypersingular integral equations. Hypersingular integral equations arise in the formulation of many problems in mechanics, such as in fracture analysis.

References
.
.
.
.
.
.
.

Integrals
Summability methods